The Pioneer Mine was an underground iron mine in Ely, Minnesota, United States, in operation from 1889 to 1967.  It is one of only two such mines on the Vermilion Range whose above-ground structures are still standing, the other being the Soudan Mine.  The Pioneer Mine Buildings and "A" Headframe were listed on the National Register of Historic Places as a historic district in 1978 for their state-level significance in the themes of engineering and industry.  They were nominated for being some of the last vestiges of a once-common mining technique on the Vermilion Range.

The complex is undergoing adaptive reuse as the Ely Arts & Heritage Center.

See also
 List of iron mines in the United States
 National Register of Historic Places listings in St. Louis County, Minnesota

References

External links

 Ely Arts & Heritage Center

1889 establishments in Minnesota
1967 disestablishments in Minnesota
Buildings and structures in Ely, Minnesota
Former mines in the United States
Historic districts on the National Register of Historic Places in Minnesota
Industrial buildings and structures on the National Register of Historic Places in Minnesota
Iron mines in the United States
Mines in Minnesota
National Register of Historic Places in St. Louis County, Minnesota